Iran–North Korea relations are described as being positive by official news agencies of the two countries. Diplomatic relations improved following the Iranian Revolution in 1979 and the establishment of an Islamic Republic. Iran and North Korea pledge cooperation in educational, scientific, and cultural spheres. Some media reports claim this cooperation extends to nuclear cooperation, though official U.S. government publications and academic studies have disputed this. The United States has been greatly concerned by North Korea's arms deals with Iran, which started during the 1980s with North Korea acting as a third party in arms deals between the Communist bloc and Iran, as well as selling domestically produced weapons to Iran, and North Korea continues selling missiles to Iran. North Korea and Iran are the remaining two members of George W. Bush's "Axis of evil", which has led to many of the concerns regarding Iran–North Korea relations.

The United States of America designates both nations as State Sponsors of Terrorism, and they reciprocate this shared enmity. Despite this, Iran is one of the few countries in the world that has a good relationship with both North and South Korea.

History
The Persian-Korean relationship started with cultural exchanges date back to the Three Kingdoms of Korea era, more than 1600 years ago by the way of the Silk Road. A dark blue glass was found in the Cheonmachong Tomb, one of Silla's royal tombs unearthed in Gyeongju, and an exotic golden sword was found in Gyerim-ro, a street also located in Gyeongju. These relics are presumed to have been sent to Silla from ancient Iran or Persia through the Silk Road. It was only the Koryeo Dynasty during King Hyeonjong's reign when trade with Persia was officially recorded in Korean history. But in academic circles, it is presumed that both countries had active cultural exchanges during the 7th century Silla era which means the relationship between Korea and Iran dates to 1500 years ago. "In a history book written by the Persian scholar Khurdadbid, it states that Silla is located at the eastern end of China and reads 'In this beautiful country Silla, there is much gold, majestetic cities and hardworking people. Their culture is comparable with Persia'.

Other items uncovered during the excavation include a silver bowl engraved with an image of the Persian goddess Anahita; a golden dagger from Persia; clay busts; and figurines portraying Middle Eastern merchants. Samguk Sagi—the official chronicle of the Three Kingdoms era, compiled in 1145—contains further descriptions of commercial items sold by Middle Eastern merchants and widely used in Silla society.

During the first decades of the Cold War, the Imperial State of Iran had no relations with the Democratic People's Republic of Korea, particularly due to Iran having relations with the Republic of Korea that were established in 1962. Both countries were allied in the U.S.-led Western Bloc. In April 1973, however, Iran established diplomatic relations with North Korea. In the following years, the two states concluded various bilateral agreements related to trade and payment (1973), cultural cooperation (1974), and inter-news agency (1978), but Iran's overall contacts with the DPRK lagged far behind its extensive cooperation with the ROK. In 1979, the pro-U.S. monarchy was deposed and was replaced with an Islamic Republic, which facilitated the improvement of Iranian-North Korean relations.

Despite the two countries' shared antagonism to U.S. foreign policies, the specific national interests of the North Korea and the Islamic Republic of Iran were often considerably different from each other. For instance, North Korea, though it provided Iran with military assistance during the Iran–Iraq War (an act that induced Baghdad to break diplomatic relations with Pyongyang on 10 October 1980), made repeated attempts to normalize its relations with the Iraqi government. In 1982, the North Korean authorities secretly invited an Iraqi delegation to Pyongyang, but the Iraqi government sent only an unofficial representative. The talks failed, but the attempt revealed that North Korea was not ideologically committed to Iran's crusade against Saddam Hussein. The Iranian leaders decided to maintain diplomatic relations with both North and South Korea. During the recent inter-Korean security crises (like the ROKS Cheonan sinking and the Bombardment of Yeonpyeong), Iranian news agencies usually quoted the statements of the Korean Central News Agency in parallel with the statements made by Western and South Korean politicians, without showing any detectable preference for either side.

Nor were the two states in full concord in adopting a position toward the various manifestations of international terrorism. On the one hand, both Iran and the North Korea provided military assistance to Hezbollah in Lebanon, and they actively sided with Syrian president Bashar al-Assad against the Syrian wing of the Islamic State of Iraq and the Levant during the Syrian civil war. On the other hand, North Korea and Iran held substantially different views about the conflicts in which the Taliban, the Boko Haram, and the Iraqi wing of ISIL were involved. While the North Korea stressed that U.S. efforts to suppress these organizations constituted interference in the internal affairs of Afghanistan, Nigeria, and Iraq, the Iranian leaders, who regarded Sunni Salafi extremism as a direct threat to their own interests, repeatedly accused America of not striving hard enough to eliminate these groups or even seeking to reach an agreement with them.

During the intertwined North Korean and Iranian nuclear crises, the favorable or unfavorable views that Iranian observers and policy-makers formed about North Korea's nuclear policies were considerably influenced by their political affiliation. In general, Iranian reformists were more negatively disposed toward the DPRK than conservative hard-liners, as they were of the opinion that Iran could not afford to pursue a confrontational nuclear strategy akin to North Korea's policy. Conservative hard-liners cited North Korea's open nuclear defiance of America's might as a positive example that Iran should emulate, but if the DPRK happened to enter nuclear talks with the U.S., they monitored the negotiations with thinly veiled distrust.

Ambassadors

List of North Korean ambassadors to Iran
 Kim Jong-nam (2000–2004)
 Kim Chang-ryong (2004–2010)
 Jo In-chol (2010–2014)
 Kang Sam-hyon (2014–2020)

List of Iranian ambassadors to North Korea
 Aliasghar Nahavandian
 Seyed Morteza Mirheidari (-1997)
 Mohammad Ganjidoost (1997–2001)
 Jalaleddin Namini Mianji (2002-2007)
 Morteza Moradian (2008–2012)
 Mansour Chavoshi (2012–2016)
 Seyed Mohsen Emadi (2017–)

Others
 Ri Won Il, chairman of the DPRK-Iran Friendship Association
 Anoushiravan Mohseni Bandpei, chairman of the Iran-Korea Parliamentary Friendship Group

Military weapons

Since the 1980s North Korea has become known as a reliable supplier of arms to other countries including Iran. Weapons sales between North Korea and Iran increased significantly during the Iran-Iraq war. This weapons sale relationship has expanded into further military cooperation including in the development of and exchange of nuclear technology. This relationship has also involved Syria.

During the Persian Gulf War North Korea is said to have supplied Iran with a range of arms including artillery, anti-aircraft machine guns, mortars, ammunition, tanks, small arms, naval mines and anti-tank and surface-to-air missile systems. In December 2009, in contravention of an arms embargo imposed on North Korea, a shipment of North Korean arms, said to be en route for Iran, according to the Congressional Research Service, was intercepted in Thailand. These weapons included rocket launchers and surface-to-air missile parts.

In addition to weapons, North Korea and Iran have an active exchange of military expertise particularly in relation to special operations and underground facilities. North Korea is thought to have trained Iranian operators in these advanced infiltration techniques.

In March 2013 North Korea and Iran, as well as Syria, blocked a UN Arms Trade Treaty aimed at setting "standards for all cross-border transfers of conventional weapons".

Arms expert Jeffrey Lewis claims that the second stage of North Korea's Hwasong-14 ICBM is similar to the upper stages designed for the Iranian space launch vehicles.

See also 
 Foreign relations of Iran
 Foreign relations of North Korea

References

Further reading
 Choi, Lyong; Shin, Jong-dae; and Lee, Han-hyung. "The Dilemma of the 'Axis of Evil': The Rise and Fall of Iran-DPRK Relations." The Korean Journal of Defense Analysis, Vol. 31, No. 4 (December 2019), pp. 595–611.

 Fitzpatrick, Mark. "Iran and North Korea: The Proliferation Nexus." Survival, Vol. 48, No. 1 (2006), pp. 61–80.

 Levkowitz, Alon. "Iran and North Korea Military Cooperation: A Partnership within the 'Axis of Evil'." Iran-Pulse 10 (2007), pp. 1–3: https://web.archive.org/web/20150107132716/http://humanities.tau.ac.il/iranian/en/previous-reviews/10-iran-pulse-en/117-10 .

 McEachern, Patrick and Jaclyn O'Brien McEachern. North Korea, Iran and the Challenge to International Order (Routledge, 2017). https://www.routledge.com/North-Korea-Iran-and-the-Challenge-to-International-Order-A-Comparative/McEachern-McEachern/p/book/9781138295124

 
North Korea
Bilateral relations of North Korea